Nieuwpoort is a tiny city in the Netherlands in the municipality of Molenlanden. The place was given city rights in 1283.

In 2001, the city of Nieuwpoort had 619 inhabitants. The built-up area of the city was 0.092 km², and contained 230 residences.
The statistical area "Nieuwpoort", which also can include the surrounding countryside, has a population of around 1370 (2006).

History 

In the 13th century, the current location of the fortress Nieuwpoort was created by Lord Van Liesveld and Lord Van Langerack. The two lords wanted a settlement and in 1270, they both gave some of their property to make this happen. In 1283, the fortress was given the privilege of a town.

After a turbulent genesis with plenty of sieges and devastation, with the 17th century more peaceful times started. The city ramparts saved the city from floods in 1809 and 1820. Due to an economical crisis in the 1930s and World War II, the city decayed. In 1970, the Provinciale Staten of South Holland initiated a reconstruction and restoration of the fortress and the city. This work was finished in 1998.

Nieuwpoort was a separate municipality until 1986, when it became part of Liesveld. The last has become part of Molenwaard in 2013.

References

External links

 Image gallery Nieuwpoort

Cities in the Netherlands
Former municipalities of South Holland
Populated places in South Holland
Molenlanden